Assassination attempts and plots on the president of the United States have been numerous, ranging from the early 19th century to the 2010s. Four sitting presidents have been killed: Abraham Lincoln (1865, by John Wilkes Booth), James A. Garfield (1881, by Charles J. Guiteau), William McKinley (1901, by Leon Czolgosz), and John F. Kennedy (1963, by Lee Harvey Oswald). Additionally, two presidents have been injured in attempted assassinations: former president Theodore Roosevelt (1912, by John Flammang Schrank) and Ronald Reagan (1981, by John Hinckley Jr.). In all of these cases, the attacker's weapon was a firearm. This article lists assassination attempts on former presidents and presidents-elect, but not on men who had not yet been elected president.

Many assassination attempts, both successful and unsuccessful, were motivated by a desire to change the policy of the American government and were undertaken by rational men. Not all such attacks, however, had political reasons. Many other attackers had questionable mental stability, and a few were judged legally insane. Historian James W. Clarke suggests that most assassination attempters have been sane and politically motivated, whereas the Department of Justice's legal manual claims that a large majority has been insane. Some assassins, especially mentally ill ones, acted solely on their own, whereas those pursuing political agendas have more often found supporting conspirators. Most assassination plotters were arrested and punished by execution or lengthy detainment in a prison or insane asylum.

Since the vice president, the successor of a removed president, shares the president's political party affiliation, the death of the president is unlikely to result in major policy changes. Possibly for that reason, political groups typically do not coordinate such attacks, even in times of partisan strife. Threats of violence against the president are often made for rhetorical or humorous effect without serious intent, while threatening the president of the United States has been a federal felony since 1917.

Presidents assassinated

Abraham Lincoln

The assassination of Abraham Lincoln, the 16th president of the United States, took place on Good Friday, April 14, 1865, at Ford's Theatre in Washington, D.C., at about 10:15 PM. The assassin, John Wilkes Booth, was a well-known actor and a Confederate sympathizer from Maryland; though he never joined the Confederate Army, he had contacts within the Confederate Secret Service. In 1864, Booth formulated a plan (very similar to one of Thomas N. Conrad previously authorized by the Confederacy) to kidnap Lincoln in exchange for the release of Confederate prisoners. After attending an April 11, 1865, speech in which Lincoln promoted voting rights for black people, Booth decided to assassinate the president instead. Learning that the president would be attending Ford's Theatre, Booth formulated a plan with co-conspirators to assassinate Lincoln at the theater, as well as Vice President Andrew Johnson and Secretary of State William H. Seward at their homes. Lincoln attended the play Our American Cousin at Ford's Theatre. As the president sat in his state box in the balcony watching the play with his wife Mary and two guests, Major Henry Rathbone and his fiancée Clara Harris, Booth entered from behind. He aimed a .44-caliber Derringer pistol at the back of Lincoln's head and fired, mortally wounding him. Rathbone momentarily grappled with Booth, but Booth stabbed him and escaped. An unconscious Lincoln was examined by doctors and taken across the street to the Petersen House. After remaining in a coma for eight hours, Lincoln died at 7:22 AM on April 15.

As he died, his breathing grew quieter, his face more calm. According to some accounts, at his last drawn breath, on the morning after the assassination, he smiled broadly and then expired. Historians, particularly author Lee Davis, have emphasized Lincoln's peaceful appearance when and after he died: "It was the first time in four years, probably, that a peaceful expression crossed his face." Field wrote in a letter to The New York Times: "there was 'no apparent suffering, no convulsive action, no rattling of the throat...[only] a mere cessation of breathing'... I had never seen upon the President's face an expression more genial and pleasing." The president's secretary, John Hay, saw "a look of unspeakable peace came upon his worn features".

Beyond Lincoln's death, the plot failed: Seward was only wounded and Johnson's would-be attacker did not follow through. After refusing to surrender, Booth was fatally shot by Union cavalryman Boston Corbett. Four other conspirators were later hanged for their roles in the conspiracy.

James A. Garfield

The assassination of James A. Garfield, the 20th president of the United States, began at the Baltimore and Potomac Railroad Station in Washington, D.C., at 9:20 AM on Saturday, July 2, 1881, less than four months after he took office. As the president was arriving at the train station, writer and lawyer Charles J. Guiteau shot him twice with a .442 Webley British Bull Dog revolver; one bullet grazed the president's shoulder, and the other pierced his back. For the next eleven weeks, Garfield endured medical malpractice before dying on September 19, 1881, at 10:35 PM, of complications caused by iatrogenic infections, which were contracted by the doctors' relentless probing of his wound with unsterilized fingers and instruments. He had survived for a total of 79 days after being shot.

Guiteau was immediately arrested. After a highly publicized trial lasting from November 14, 1881, to January 25, 1882, he was found guilty and sentenced to death. A subsequent appeal was rejected, and he was executed by hanging on June 30, 1882, in the District of Columbia, two days before the first anniversary of the shooting. Guiteau was assessed during his trial and autopsy as mentally unbalanced or suffering from the effects of neurosyphilis. He claimed to have shot Garfield out of disappointment at being passed over for appointment as Ambassador to France. He attributed the president's victory in the election to a speech he wrote in support of Garfield.

William McKinley

The assassination of United States President William McKinley took place at 4:07 PM on Friday, September 6, 1901, at the Temple of Music in Buffalo, New York. McKinley, attending the Pan-American Exposition, was shot twice in the abdomen at close range by Leon Czolgosz, an anarchist, who was armed with a .32-caliber revolver that was concealed underneath a handkerchief. The first bullet ricocheted off either a button or an award medal on McKinley's jacket and lodged in his sleeve; the second shot pierced his stomach. Although McKinley initially appeared to be recovering, his condition rapidly declined due to gangrene setting in around his wounds and he died on September 14, 1901, at 2:15 AM.

Members of the crowd, started by James Benjamin Parker, subdued and captured Czolgosz. Afterward, the fourth Brigade, National Guard Signal Corps, and police intervened, beating Czolgosz so severely it was initially thought he might not live to stand trial. On September 24, after a two-day trial, in which the defendant refused to defend himself, Czolgosz was convicted and later sentenced to death. He was executed by the electric chair in Auburn Prison on October 29, 1901. Czolgosz's actions were politically motivated, although it remains unclear what outcome, if any, he believed the shooting would yield.

Following President McKinley's assassination, Congress directed the Secret Service to protect the president of the United States as part of its mandate.

John F. Kennedy

The assassination of United States President John F. Kennedy took place at 12:30 PM on Friday, November 22, 1963, in Dallas, Texas, during a presidential motorcade in Dealey Plaza. Kennedy was riding with his wife Jacqueline, Texas Governor John Connally, and Connally's wife Nellie when he was fatally shot by former U.S. Marine and American defector Lee Harvey Oswald from the sixth floor of the Texas School Book Depository. He was shot once in the back, the bullet exiting via his throat, and once in the head. Governor Connally was seriously wounded, and bystander James Tague received a minor facial injury from a small piece of curbstone that had fragmented after it was struck by one of the bullets. The motorcade rushed to Parkland Memorial Hospital, where President Kennedy was pronounced dead at 1:00 PM. Oswald was arrested and charged by the Dallas Police Department for the assassination of Kennedy and for the murder of Dallas policeman J. D. Tippit, who was shot dead in a residential neighborhood in the Oak Cliff section of Dallas just hours later. On Sunday, November 24, while being transferred from the city jail to the county jail, Oswald was fatally shot in the basement of Dallas Police Department Headquarters by Dallas nightclub owner Jack Ruby. Ruby was convicted of Oswald's murder, even though it was later overturned on appeal. In 1967, Ruby died in prison while awaiting a new trial.

In September 1964, the Warren Commission concluded that Kennedy and Tippit were both killed by Oswald, that Oswald had acted entirely alone in both murders, and that Ruby had acted alone in killing Oswald. Nonetheless, polls conducted from 1966 to 2004 found that up to 80% of Americans surveyed have suspected that there was a plot or cover-up to kill President Kennedy. Conspiracy theories have persisted to the present.

Presidents wounded

Theodore Roosevelt

Three-and-a-half years after he left office, Theodore Roosevelt ran in the 1912 presidential election as a member of the Progressive Party. While campaigning in Milwaukee, Wisconsin on October 14, 1912, John Flammang Schrank, a saloon-keeper from New York who had been stalking him for weeks, shot Roosevelt once in the chest with a .38-caliber Colt Police Positive Special. The 50-page text of his campaign speech titled "Progressive Cause Greater Than Any Individual", folded over twice in Roosevelt's breast pocket, and a metal glasses case slowed the bullet, saving his life. Schrank was immediately disarmed, captured, and might have been lynched had Roosevelt not shouted for Schrank to remain unharmed. Roosevelt assured the crowd he was all right, then ordered police to take charge of Schrank and to make sure no violence was done to him.

Roosevelt, as an experienced hunter and anatomist, correctly concluded that since he was not coughing blood, the bullet had not reached his lung, and he declined suggestions to go to the hospital immediately. Instead, he delivered his scheduled speech with blood seeping into his shirt. He spoke for 84 minutes before completing his speech and accepting medical attention. His opening comments to the gathered crowd were, "Ladies and gentlemen, I don't know whether you fully understand that I have just been shot, but it takes more than that to kill a Bull Moose." Afterwards, probes and an x-ray showed that the bullet had lodged in Roosevelt's chest muscle, but did not penetrate the pulmonary pleurae. Doctors concluded that it would be less dangerous to leave it in place than to attempt to remove it, and Roosevelt carried the bullet with him for the rest of his life. He spent two weeks recuperating before returning to the campaign trail. Despite his tenacity, Roosevelt ultimately lost his bid for reelection to the Democratic candidate Woodrow Wilson.

At Schrank's trial, the would-be assassin claimed that William McKinley had visited him in a dream and told him to avenge his assassination by killing Roosevelt. He was found legally insane and was institutionalized until his death in 1943.

Ronald Reagan

On March 30, 1981, as Ronald Reagan returned to his limousine after speaking at the Washington Hilton hotel, would-be assassin John Hinckley Jr. fired six gunshots toward him, striking him and three others. Reagan was seriously wounded by a bullet that ricocheted off the side of the presidential limousine and hit him in the left underarm, breaking a rib, puncturing a lung, and causing serious internal bleeding. Although "close to death" upon arrival at George Washington University Hospital, Reagan was stabilized in the emergency room, then underwent emergency exploratory surgery. He recovered and was released from the hospital on April 11. Besides Reagan, White House press secretary James Brady, Secret Service agent Tim McCarthy, and police officer Thomas Delahanty were also wounded. All three survived, but Brady suffered brain damage and was permanently disabled; Brady's death in 2014 was considered homicide because it was ultimately caused by this injury.

Hinckley was immediately arrested, and later said he had wanted to kill Reagan to impress actress Jodie Foster. He was deemed mentally ill and confined to an institution. Hinckley was released from institutional psychiatric care on September 10, 2016, 35 years after the incident and 12 years after Reagan's death from pneumonia complicated by Alzheimer's disease.

Assassination attempts and plots

Andrew Jackson

 January 30, 1835: Just outside the Capitol Building, a house painter named Richard Lawrence attempted to shoot President Andrew Jackson with two pistols, both of which misfired. Lawrence was apprehended after Jackson beat him severely with his cane. Lawrence was found not guilty by reason of insanity and confined to a mental institution until his death in 1861.

Abraham Lincoln
 February 23, 1861: President-elect Abraham Lincoln passed through Baltimore amid threats of the Baltimore Plot, an alleged conspiracy by Confederate sympathizers in Maryland to assassinate Lincoln en route to his inauguration, being carried out. Allan Pinkerton's National Detective Agency played a key role in protecting the president-elect by managing Lincoln's security throughout the journey. Although scholars debate whether the threat was real, Lincoln and his advisers took actions to ensure his safe passage through Baltimore.
 August 1864: A lone rifle shot fired by an unknown sniper missed Lincoln's head by inches (passing through his hat) as he rode in the late evening, unguarded, north from the White House  to the Soldiers' Home (his regular retreat where he would work and sleep before returning to the White House the following morning). Near 11:00 PM, Private John W. Nichols of the Pennsylvania 150th Volunteers, the sentry on duty at the gated entrance to the Soldiers' Home grounds, heard the rifle shot and moments later saw the president riding toward him "bareheaded". Lincoln described the matter to Ward Lamon, his old friend and loyal bodyguard.

William Howard Taft

 In 1909, William Howard Taft and Porfirio Díaz planned a summit in El Paso, Texas, and Ciudad Juárez, Chihuahua, a historic first meeting between a U.S. president and a Mexican president and also the first time an American president would cross the border into Mexico. Díaz requested the meeting to show U.S. support for his planned eighth run as president, and Taft agreed to support Díaz in order to protect the several billion dollars of American capital then invested in Mexico. Both sides agreed that the disputed Chamizal strip connecting El Paso to Ciudad Juárez would be considered neutral territory with no flags present during the summit, but the meeting focused attention on this territory and resulted in assassination threats and other serious security concerns. The Texas Rangers, 4,000 U.S. and Mexican troops, U.S. Secret Service agents, FBI agents, and U.S. Marshals were all called in to provide security. An additional 250 private security detail led by Frederick Russell Burnham, the celebrated scout, was hired by John Hays Hammond. Hammond was a close friend of Taft from Yale University and a former candidate for U.S. vice president in the 1908 presidential election who, along with his business partner Burnham, held considerable mining interests in Mexico. On October 16, the day of the summit, Burnham and Private C.R. Moore, a Texas Ranger, discovered 52-year-old Julius Bergerson holding a concealed palm pistol standing at the El Paso Chamber of Commerce building along the procession route. Burnham and Moore captured and disarmed Bergerson within only a few feet (around one meter) of Taft and Díaz.

Herbert Hoover
 On November 19, 1928, President-elect Hoover embarked on a ten-nation "goodwill tour" of Central and South America. While crossing the Andes Mountains from Chile, an assassination plot by Argentine anarchists was thwarted. The group was led by Severino Di Giovanni, who planned to blow up his train as it crossed the Argentinian central plain. The plotters had an itinerary but the bomber was arrested before he could place the explosives on the rails. Hoover professed unconcern, tearing off the front page of a newspaper that revealed the plot and explaining, "It's just as well that Lou shouldn't see it," referring to his wife. His complimentary remarks on Argentina were well received in both the host country and in the press.

Franklin D. Roosevelt

 On February 15, 1933, seventeen days before Roosevelt's first presidential inauguration, Giuseppe Zangara fired five shots at Roosevelt in Miami, Florida. Zangara's shots missed the president-elect, but Zangara did mortally wound Chicago Mayor Anton Cermak and injure four other people. Zangara pleaded guilty to the murder of Cermak and was executed in the electric chair on March 20, 1933. It has never been conclusively determined who was Zangara's target, but most assumed at first that he had been shooting at the president-elect. Another theory is that the attempt may have been ordered by the imprisoned Al Capone, and that Cermak, who had led a crackdown on the Chicago Outfit and Chicago organized crime more generally, was the true target.
 The Soviet NKVD claimed to have discovered a Nazi German Waffen-SS plan to assassinate Roosevelt, Winston Churchill, and Joseph Stalin at the Tehran Conference in 1943.

Harry S. Truman

 Mid-1947: During the Jewish insurgency in Palestine before the formation of the State of Israel, the Zionist Stern Gang was believed to have sent a number of letter bombs addressed to the president and high-ranking staff at the White House. The Secret Service had been alerted by British intelligence after similar letters had been sent to high-ranking British officials and the Gang claimed credit. The mail room of the White House intercepted the letters and the Secret Service defused them. At the time, the incident was not publicized. Truman's daughter Margaret Truman confirmed the incident in her biography of Truman published in 1972. It had earlier been told in a memoir by Ira R. T. Smith, who worked in the mail room.
 November 1, 1950: Two Puerto Rican pro-independence activists, Oscar Collazo and Griselio Torresola, attempted to kill President Truman at the Blair House, where Truman was living while the White House was undergoing major renovations. In the attack, Torresola injured White House Policeman Joseph Downs and mortally wounded White House Policeman Leslie Coffelt. Coffelt returned fire, killing Torresola with a shot to the head. Collazo wounded an officer before being shot in the stomach. Collazo survived with serious injuries. Truman was not harmed, but he was placed at a huge risk. Collazo was convicted in a federal trial and received the death sentence. Truman commuted Collazo's death sentence to life in prison. In 1979, President Jimmy Carter further commuted Collazo's sentence to time served.

John F. Kennedy
 December 11, 1960: While vacationing in Palm Beach, Florida, President-elect John F. Kennedy was threatened by Richard Paul Pavlick, a 73-year-old former postal worker driven by hatred of Catholics. Pavlick intended to crash his dynamite-laden 1950 Buick into Kennedy's vehicle, but he changed his mind after seeing Kennedy's wife and daughter bid him goodbye. Pavlick was arrested three days later by the Secret Service after being stopped for a driving violation; police found the dynamite in his car and arrested him. On January 27, 1961, Pavlick was committed to the United States Public Health Service mental hospital in Springfield, Missouri, then was indicted for threatening Kennedy's life seven weeks later. Charges against Pavlick were dropped on December 2, 1963, ten days after Kennedy's assassination in Dallas. Judge Emett Clay Choate ruled that Pavlick was unable to distinguish between right and wrong in his actions, but kept him in the mental hospital. The federal government also dropped charges in August 1964, and Pavlick was eventually released from the New Hampshire State Hospital on December 13, 1966. He died in 1975 aged 88.

Richard Nixon
 April 13, 1972: Arthur Bremer carried a firearm to a motorcade in Ottawa, Canada, intending to shoot Nixon, but the president's car went by too fast for Bremer to get a good shot. The next day, Bremer thought he saw Nixon's car outside of the Centre Block, but it had disappeared by the time he could retrieve his gun from his hotel room. A few weeks later, he instead shot and seriously injured the governor of Alabama, George Wallace, who was paralyzed until his death in 1998. Three other people were unintentionally wounded. Bremer served 35 years in prison for the shooting of Governor Wallace.
 Late May 1972: During Nixon's official visit to Tehran, Iran, a "Marxist terrorist group" named People's Mujahedin of Iran blew up a bomb at Reza Shah's mausoleum, where Nixon was scheduled to attend a ceremony just 45 minutes after the explosion. This may have been the earliest known attempt on the president's life by an Islamic extremist.
 February 22, 1974: Samuel Byck planned to kill Nixon by crashing a commercial airliner into the White House. He hijacked a DC-9 at Baltimore-Washington International Airport after killing a Maryland Aviation Administration police officer, and was told that it could not take off with the wheel blocks still in place. After he shot both pilots (one later died), an officer named Charles 'Butch' Troyer shot Byck through the plane's door window. He survived long enough to kill himself by shooting.

Gerald Ford

 September 5, 1975: On the northern grounds of the California State Capitol, Lynette "Squeaky" Fromme, a follower of Charles Manson, drew a Colt M1911 .45-caliber pistol on Ford when he reached to shake her hand in a crowd. She had four cartridges in the pistol's magazine but none in the firing chamber, and as a result, the gun did not fire. She was quickly restrained by Secret Service agent Larry Buendorf. Fromme was sentenced to life in prison, but was released from custody on August 14, 2009 (two years and eight months after Ford's death in 2006).
A bystander, Oliver Sipple, grabbed Moore's arm and the shot missed Ford, striking a building wall and slightly injuring taxi driver John Ludwig. Moore was tried and convicted in federal court, and sentenced to prison for life. She was paroled from a federal prison on December 31, 2007, after serving more than 30 years—one year and five days after Ford's natural death.

Jimmy Carter
 May 5, 1979: Raymond Lee Harvey was an Ohio-born unemployed American drifter. He was arrested by the Secret Service after being found carrying a starter pistol with blank rounds, ten minutes before Carter was to give a speech at the Civic Center Mall in Los Angeles on May 5, 1979. Harvey had a history of mental illness, but police had to investigate his claim that he was part of a four-man operation to assassinate the president. According to Harvey, he fired seven blank rounds from the starter pistol on the hotel roof on the night of May 4 to test how much noise it would make. He claimed to have been with one of the plotters that night, whom he knew as "Julio". (This man was later identified as a 21-year-old illegal immigrant from Mexico, who gave the name Osvaldo Espinoza Ortiz.) At the time of his arrest, Harvey had eight spent rounds in his pocket, as well as 70 unspent blank rounds for the gun. Harvey was jailed on a $50,000 bond, given his transient status, and Ortiz was alternately reported as being held on a $100,000 bond as a material witness or held on a $50,000 bond being charged with burglary from a car. Charges against the pair were ultimately dismissed for a lack of evidence.
 John Hinckley Jr. came close to shooting Carter during his re-election campaign, but he lost his nerve. He would later attempt to kill President Ronald Reagan in March 1981.

George H. W. Bush

 April 13, 1993: According to Kuwaiti authorities, and an FBI investigation  fourteen Kuwaiti and Iraqi men believed to be working for Saddam Hussein smuggled bombs into Kuwait, planning to assassinate former President Bush by a car bomb during his visit to Kuwait University three months after he had left office in January 1993. The former president was on a visit to Kuwait in 1993 to commemorate the coalition's victory over Iraq in the Persian Gulf War when Kuwaiti officials claimed to have foiled an alleged assassination plot and arrested the suspects. At the time the former president was accompanied by his wife, two of his sons, former Secretary of State James A. Baker III, former Chief of Staff John Sununu, and former Treasury Secretary Nicholas Brady. Of the 17 people Kuwaiti authorities arrested, two suspects, Wali Abdelhadi Ghazali and Raad Abdel-Amir al-Assadi, retracted their confessions at the trial, claiming that they were coerced. A Kuwaiti court convicted all but one of the defendants. Then-president Bill Clinton responded by launching a cruise missile attack on an Iraqi intelligence building in the Mansour district of Baghdad. The plot was used as one of the justifications for the Iraq Resolution authorizing the 2003 U.S. invasion of the country. An analysis by the CIA's Counterterrorism Center concludes the assassination plot was likely fabricated by Kuwaiti authorities, however at the time the FBI established that the plot had been directed by the Iraqi Intelligence Service (IIS), and The CIA had received information suggesting that Saddam Hussein had authorized the assassination attempt to get revenge against the U.S, to punish Kuwait for working with the U.S, and to keep other Arab states for intervening in Iraq any further. The day before the attack, on April 12th, 1993, the then U.S. Ambassador to the U.N. and future 64th U.S. secretary of state, Madeleine K. Albright, went before the U.N. Security Council to present evidence of the Iraqi plot with the hope of gaining international support.

Bill Clinton

January 21, 1994: Ronald Gene Barbour, a retired military officer and freelance writer, plotted to kill Clinton while the president was jogging. Barbour returned to Florida a week later without having fired the shots at the president, who was on a state visit to Russia. Barbour was sentenced to five years in prison and was released in 1998.
September 12, 1994: Frank Eugene Corder flew a stolen single-engine Cessna 150 onto the White House lawn and crashed into a tree. Corder, a truck driver from Maryland who reportedly had alcohol problems, allegedly tried to hit the White House. He was killed in the crash and was the only fatality. The president and first family were not in residence at the time.
October 29, 1994: Francisco Martin Duran fired at least 29 shots with a 7.62×39mm Type 56 semi-automatic rifle at the White House from a fence overlooking the North Lawn, thinking that Clinton was among the men in dark suits standing there (Clinton was inside). Three tourists, Harry Rakosky, Ken Davis and Robert Haines, tackled Duran before he could injure anyone. Found to have a suicide note in his pocket, Duran was sentenced to 40 years in prison.
November 1994: Osama bin Laden recruited Ramzi Yousef, the mastermind of the 1993 World Trade Center bombing, to attempt to assassinate Clinton. However, Yousef decided that security would be too effective and decided to target Pope John Paul II instead. 
November 24, 1996: During his visit to the Asia-Pacific Economic Cooperation (APEC) forum in Manila, Clinton's motorcade was rerouted before it was to drive over a bridge. Service officers had intercepted a message suggesting that an attack was imminent, and Lewis Merletti, the director of the Secret Service, ordered the motorcade to be re-routed. An intelligence team later discovered a bomb under the bridge. Subsequent U.S. investigation "revealed that [the plot] was masterminded by a Saudi terrorist living in Afghanistan named Osama bin Laden".
October 2018: A package containing a pipe bomb addressed to wife Hillary Clinton and sent to their home in Chappaqua, New York was intercepted by the Secret Service. It was one of several mailed to other Democratic leaders in the same week, including former president Barack Obama. Bill Clinton was at the Chappaqua home when the package was intercepted, while Hillary was in Florida campaigning for Democrats in the 2018 midterm elections. Fingerprint DNA revealed that the package was sent by Florida resident Cesar Sayoc, who was captured two days after the package was intercepted. Prosecutors sought a life sentence for Sayoc, but the judge instead sentenced him to 20 years in prison.

George W. Bush

 May 10, 2005: While President Bush was giving a speech in the Freedom Square in Tbilisi, Georgia, Vladimir Arutyunian threw a live Soviet-made RGD-5 hand grenade toward the podium. The grenade had its pin pulled, but did not explode because a red tartan handkerchief was wrapped tightly around it, preventing the safety lever from detaching. After escaping that day, Arutyunian was arrested in July 2005. During his arrest, he killed an Interior Ministry agent. He was convicted in January 2006 and given a life sentence.
 May 24, 2022: Shihab Ahmed Shihab Shihab, an Iraqi citizen and resident of Columbus, Ohio, was arrested for involvement in a plot to assassinate President Bush based on information obtained from conversations he held with several undercover FBI informants. He was also accused of committing an immigration crime and planning to illegally smuggle Iraqi nationals into the U.S. from Mexico in order to assist with the plot. He additionally claimed to informants that he had direct connections to members of the former ISIS, including ones to former ISIS leader Abu Bakr Al-Baghdadi (before his death) and a former ISIS financial chief, the latter of whom he intended to launder money from into the U.S. via a Columbus car dealership. In February, Shihab and an informant traveled to the Bush home in Dallas, Texas and to the George W. Bush Institute to conduct surveillance. Shihab entered the country illegally in September 2020 with false identification. Shihab claimed to have worked with Iraqi terrorists to kill many American servicemen in Iraq from 2003 to 2006 following the invasion. He stated that the motivation behind the assassination plot was anger over the Iraq War.

Barack Obama

December 2008: A United States Marine, 20-year-old Kody Brittingham, wrote that he had taken an oath to "protect against all enemies, both foreign and domestic." In a signed "letter of intent," he identified President-elect Obama as a "domestic enemy" and the target of Brittingham's planned assassination plot. In June 2010, he was sentenced to 100 months in federal prison.
April 2009: A plot to assassinate Obama at the Alliance of Civilizations summit in Istanbul, Turkey, was discovered after a man of Syrian origins carrying forged Al Jazeera TV press credentials was found. The man confessed to the Turkish security services details of his plan to kill Obama with a knife. He alleged that he had three accomplices.
November 2011: 21-year-old Oscar Ramiro Ortega-Hernandez was influenced by conspiracy theories and fringe religious viewpoints to attempt to murder Obama. Having traveled from his native Idaho, he hit the White House with several rounds fired from a semi-automatic rifle. No one was injured, but a window was broken. He was sentenced to 25 years in prison.
2011–2012: The far-right terrorist group FEAR plotted to carry out a series of terror attacks which included assassinating Obama. The plot was foiled when four members of the group were arrested on murder charges and one, Michael Burnett, agreed to co-operate with authorities in return for a lighter sentence.
October 2012: A mentally ill man named Mitchell Kusick was arrested after confessing to his therapist that he intended to kill Obama with a shotgun at a campaign stop in Boulder, Colorado.
April 2013: Another attempt was made when a letter laced with ricin, a toxin, was sent to Obama.
October 2018: A package that contained a pipe bomb was sent to former President Obama at his home in Washington, D.C. The package was intercepted by the Secret Service.

Donald Trump

 September 6, 2017: Gregory Lee Leingang, a 42-year-old man from North Dakota, attempted to assassinate President Donald Trump in Mandan, North Dakota, while Trump was visiting the state to rally public support. Leingang stole a forklift from an oil refinery and drove toward the presidential motorcade. After the forklift became jammed within the refinery, he fled on foot and was arrested by the pursuing police. While interviewed in detention, he admitted his intent to murder the president by flipping the presidential limousine with the stolen forklift, to the surprise of authorities, who suspected he was merely stealing the vehicle for personal use. The man pled guilty to the attempted attack, stealing the forklift, related charges and several other unrelated crimes on the same day. Consequently, he was sentenced to 20 years in prison. His defense attorney noted a "serious psychiatric crisis". Leingang's choice of a forklift as a weapon was unique among presidential assassination attempts.
November 2017: A man affiliated with the Islamic State of Iraq and the Levant (ISIL), whose name was not revealed, was arrested by the Philippine National Police in Rizal Park, Manila, for reportedly planning to assassinate Trump during the diplomatic ASEAN Summit. In the prior week to the failed killing, the Secret Service already suspected a planned assault on the president because of the general presence of ISIL in the Philippines and because of threats by many people against the president on social media. Before the landing of Trump's airplane, the Secret Service discovered a credible terrorist threat from a man who threatened to kill the president on social media, quickly tracking down and arresting the terrorist. The government disclosed the incident to the public after a year of silence in a television documentary.

Deaths rumored to have been assassinations

Zachary Taylor

On July 9, 1850, President Zachary Taylor died from an illness that was diagnosed as cholera morbus. Almost immediately after his death, rumors began to circulate that Taylor was poisoned by pro-slavery Southerners, and similar theories have persisted into the 21st century. In 1991 a neutron activation analysis conducted on samples of Taylor's remains found no evidence of poisonings due to insufficient levels of arsenic. Political scientist Michael Parenti questions the traditional explanation for Taylor's death. Relying on interviews and reports by forensic pathologists, he argues that the procedure used to test for arsenic poisoning was fundamentally flawed.

Warren G. Harding

In June 1923, President Warren G. Harding set out on a cross-country Voyage of Understanding, planning to meet with citizens and explain his policies. During this trip, he became the first president to visit Alaska, which was then a U.S. territory. Rumors of corruption in the Harding administration were beginning to circulate in Washington, D.C., by 1923, and Harding was profoundly shocked by a long message he received while in Alaska, apparently detailing illegal activities by his own cabinet that were allegedly unknown to him. At the end of July, while traveling south from Alaska through British Columbia, he developed what was thought to be a severe case of food poisoning. He gave the final speech of his life to a large crowd at the University of Washington Stadium (now Husky Stadium) at the University of Washington campus in Seattle, Washington. A scheduled speech in Portland, Oregon, was canceled. The president's train proceeded south to San Francisco. Upon arriving at the Palace Hotel, he developed pneumonia. Harding died in his hotel room of either a heart attack or a stroke at 7:35 PM on August 2, 1923. The formal announcement, printed in The New York Times of that day, stated: "A stroke of apoplexy was the cause of death." He had been ill exactly one week.

Naval physicians surmised that Harding had suffered a heart attack. The Hardings' personal medical advisor, homeopath and Surgeon General Charles E. Sawyer, disagreed with the diagnosis. His wife, Florence Harding, refused permission for an autopsy, which soon led to speculation that the president had been the victim of a plot, possibly carried out by his wife, as Harding apparently had been unfaithful to the first lady. Gaston B. Means, an amateur historian and gadfly, noted in his book The Strange Death of President Harding (1930) that the circumstances surrounding his death led to suspicions that he had been poisoned. A number of individuals attached to him, both personally and politically, would have welcomed Harding's death, as they would have been disgraced in association by Means' assertion of Harding's "imminent impeachment".

See also
Assassination of Robert F. Kennedy, Democratic presidential candidate, on June 5, 1968
Assassins, a musical about presidential assassins and assassination attempters
Attempted assassination of George Wallace, Democratic presidential candidate, on May 15, 1972
Attempted assassination of Thomas R. Marshall, vice president, on July 2, 1915
Curse of Tippecanoe, supposed pattern of certain presidents dying while in office
Kennedy curse
List of assassinated and executed heads of state and government
List of incidents of political violence in Washington, D.C.
List of White House security breaches

References

Bibliography

 
 
  Free at the Internet Archive: Volume 1 and Volume 2.
 
 
 
 

 
 
United States
Assassination attempts, U.S. Presidents
Presidential assassination attempts and plots
Assassination attempts
Assassination attempts